Caroline Dana Howe (Dana; August 21, 1824 - October 30, 1907) was an American writer of prose, poetry, and hymns. Her celebrated song, "Leaf by Leaf the Roses Fall", was claimed and used by several different authors, until her authorship was reasserted, the publishers appending her name to all later editions. A large number of Howe's songs were set to music for which they were easily adapted, and were found in sheet music and in church collections. The songs were gathered into at least 26 collections, and it was said that no living writer in Maine was more favorably known in that day as a writer of songs than Howe. She was also well known as a writer of short serial stories, juvenile sketches, and essays. The Massachusetts Sunday School Society  published a book of about 200 pages of hers, carried successfully through several editions. Howe died in 1907.

Biography
Caroline Dana was born in Fryeburg, Maine, August 21, 1824. She resided in Portland, Maine since early childhood.

She lived in her home for more than 30 years, sharing it with the family of her nephew. There, she wrote most of the poems that gave her a position among the leading hymn singers. A Massachusetts critic, in enumerating the eight songs by American women of the day, sung everywhere, called attention to the fact that four of them were written in Maine, and one of them, "Leaf by Leaf the Roses Fall", by Howe. This popular song was written by her in 1856, and first published in Gleason's Pictorial. A few years later, it appeared in another Boston paper, set to music, the composer claiming the words as his own. Several other composers were equally unscrupulous, and it was not until after many years that the question of authorship was finally settled, through the efforts of Oliver Ditson, and proper credit given thereafter by various publishers.

Her first literary work appeared in the Portland Transcript, and in this, as in other leading publications, her contributions of prose and verse were favorably received by the public. In 1862, the Massachusetts Sunday School Society published in book form a story written by her, which passed through several editions. Her verse was characterized by lyric power, by grace of diction, by religious fervor and aspiration, and a sincere heartiness. It was adapted for music, and more than 30 of her hymns and songs were published in collections for church choirs, and in sheet music, becoming very popular. In 1885, a collection of Howe's poems was made under title of "Ashes for Flame and Other Poems".

She died October 30, 1907.

"Leaf by Leaf the Roses Fall"
Of the poem, "Leaf by Leaf the Roses Fall!" Howe said in 1889: 

Leaf by leaf the roses fall,
  Drop by drop the springs run dry, 
One by one, beyond recall,
  Summer beauties fade and die; 
But the roses bloom again.
  And the springs will gush anew 
In the pleasant April rain,
  And the summer's sun and dew.
So in hours of deepest gloom,
  When the springs of gladness fail. 
And the roses in their bloom
  Droop like maidens wan and pale, 
We shall find some hope that lies
  Like a silent germ apart, 
Hidden far from careless eyes,
  In the garden of the heart.
Some sweet hope to gladness wed,
  That will spring afresh and new, 
When grief's winter shall have fled.
  Giving place to sun and dew. 
Some sweet hope that breathes of spring,
  Through the weary, weary time, 
Budding for its blossoming.
  In the spirit's silent clime.

Selected works

Hymns
Angels clothed in shining raiment
Like the birds that sing in the early spring
O prodigal, come, I am waiting
On the heights why standest thou
Press nobly on as God has called
Thine are the rivers: Thine, O God, the power
Where, where are the dear

See also
1874 in music

References

Attribution

Bibliography

External links
 
 Caroline Dana Howe at hymnary.org

1824 births
1907 deaths
19th-century American women writers
19th-century American poets
19th-century American women musicians
American women poets
American hymnwriters
American essayists
People from Fryeburg, Maine
American short story writers
American women short story writers
Writers from Maine
American lyricists
American women hymnwriters
American women essayists